José Manuel Soto (born 19 September 1946) is a former Costa Rican cyclist. He competed in the individual road race and the team time trial events at the 1968 Summer Olympics.

References

External links
 

1946 births
Living people
Costa Rican male cyclists
Olympic cyclists of Costa Rica
Cyclists at the 1968 Summer Olympics
People from San José, Costa Rica